Mark Pirro (born July 1, 1970) is an American musician (bass guitar), audio engineer, and record producer based in Dallas, Texas. He is a founding member of Tripping Daisy, an alternative rock band that was active from 1991 to 1999. He is an original and current performing member of The Polyphonic Spree, and also performed with the groups Menkena and Foreign Fires. Pirro is the inventor of the Copperphone, a specialty microphone that he designed and distributes through his company Placid Audio.

Career

Pirro is a founding member of Tripping Daisy along with vocalist Tim DeLaughter and guitarist and pianist Wes Berggren. The group released its first album Bill in 1992 on the independent label Dragon Street Records. It later signed with Island Records where it released the album I am An Elastic Firecracker in 1995 and Jesus Hits Like The Atom Bomb in 1998. The group's song I Got A Girl made it to number 6 on Billboard's alternative rock chart. Pirro performed with Tripping Daisy on Late Night with Conan O'Brien in 1993 as well as supported Def Leppard during the North American portion of the Slang World Tour. Pirro played with the group until 1999 after the death of Berggren. Pirro and the remaining members completed the group's fourth album after Berggren's death and released it under its own record label, Good Records.
 
Pirro went on to join The Polyphonic Spree, a choral symphonic rock band formed by DeLaughter in 2000. The 25 member group includes two keyboardists, a harpist, and a 10-person choir. As part of the group, Pirro has toured with David Bowie, played at a Nobel Peace Prize ceremony, been on the MTV Video Music Awards, and performed Sgt. Pepper's Lonely Hearts Club Band in front of former Beatles' producer George Martin. Additional appearances including performing with Paul Rodgers and the remaining members of Queen during Queen's 2004 induction ceremony into the UK Rock and Roll Hall of Fame. He has toured internationally with The Polyphonic Spree throughout the United States, Europe, Japan, Australia, Canada, and Uganda. He also appeared with the group in the 2015 film The Big Short, as well as on the soundtrack to the movie.
 
Pirro is the inventor of the Copperphone, a hand crafted microphone designed and built through his company Placid Audio.  The Copperphone uses components from vintage communications equipment as well as a mechanical filtering device to achieve a limited bandwidth frequency response similar to that of AM radio and the nostalgic sound of the early days of recording. He designed the first Copperphone while playing with The Polyphonic Spree, as a way to produce a "telephone" voice effect for lead singer DeLeaughter. The Copperphone has been used by many artists, including Green Day, Queens of the Stone Age, Lou Barlow, Rush, Norah Jones, Jack White, St. Vincent, as well as Grammy Winning producer Jacquire King.
 
Pirro has been known to use instruments, software and effects from Musicvox, iZotope, FEA Labs, and Waterstone Guitars.

Discography

References

External links
 Placid Audio Official Website
 The Polyphonic Spree Official Website

Living people
American rock bass guitarists
American male bass guitarists
People from Dallas
1970 births
The Polyphonic Spree members
21st-century American bass guitarists
21st-century American male musicians